Bathymophila is a genus of sea snails, marine gastropod mollusks in the family Solariellidae.

Previously Bathymophila was brought under the subfamily Margaritinae, because of the resemblance of its shell with Margarites Gray, 1847

Description
The shell has a broad flattened columella, which has a blunt tooth, rough or granulated, at its end.

Species
Species within the genus Bathymophila include:
 Bathymophila aages Vilvens, 2009
 Bathymophila alabida (B. A. Marshall, 1979)
 Bathymophila asphala Marshall, 1999
 Bathymophila bairdii (Dall, 1889)
 Bathymophila callomphala (Schepman, 1908)
 Bathymophila dawsoni (B. A. Marshall, 1979)
 Bathymophila diadema (B. A. Marshall, 1999)
 Bathymophila euspira (Dall, 1881) 
 Bathymophila gravida Marshall, 1999
 Bathymophila micans (Dautzenberg & Fischer, 1896) 
 Bathymophila valentia Marshall, 1999
Species brought into synonymy
 Bathymophila nitens (Dall, 1881): synonym of Bathymophila euspira (Dall, 1881)
 Bathymophila tenorioi' Poppe, Tagaro & Dekker, 2006: synonym of Arxellia tenorioi'' (Poppe, Tagaro & Dekker, 2006) (original combination)

References

External links

 
Solariellidae